Fleetwood station is a commuter rail stop on the Metro-North Railroad's Harlem Line, located in the Fleetwood section of Mount Vernon, New York.

As of August 2006, daily commuter ridership was 2,355 and there are 654 parking spots.

History
Fleetwood station was originally built on October 25, 1924 by the New York Central Railroad. The Cross County Parkway was built over the station, and was widened during the 1950s and 1960s. As with the rest of the Harlem Line, the merger of New York Central with Pennsylvania Railroad in 1968 transformed it into a Penn Central station, whose service was gradually merged with the Metropolitan Transportation Authority, and officially became part of Metro-North in 1983. In the Spring of 1989, the platforms were reconstructed, along with those of Bronxville, Tuckahoe, and Crestwood stations. A two-track girder bridge over the Bronx River can be found north of the station. When the station was triple-tracked, a new bridge for the third track was built north of the station.

Station layout
The station has two slightly offset high-level platforms each 12 cars long.

References

External links

 West Broad Street entrance from Google Maps Street View
Platforms from Google Maps Street View
Waiting Room (Above Platforms) from Google Maps Street View

Metro-North Railroad stations in New York (state)
Former New York Central Railroad stations
Mount Vernon, New York
Railway stations in Westchester County, New York
Railway stations in the United States opened in 1924
Transportation in Westchester County, New York
1924 establishments in New York (state)